Arthur Hamilton Williamson (26 July 1930 – 26 June 2020) was a Scottish professional footballer who made over 260 appearances in the Football League for Southend United as a right back. He made a record 230 consecutive appearances in all competitions for the club. Williamson also made one appearance in the Scottish League for Clyde.

Personal life 
William's older brother Jimmy was also a footballer. After retiring from football, Williamson returned to Scotland to run his family's butchery business in Perthshire.

References 

1930 births
2020 deaths
Footballers from Perth and Kinross
Scottish footballers
English Football League players
Association football fullbacks
Jeanfield Swifts F.C. players
Clyde F.C. players
Southend United F.C. players
Scottish Football League players
Scottish butchers